Perfect Gentleman may refer to:

"Perfect Gentleman" (Helloween song), 1994
"Perfect Gentleman" (Wyclef Jean song), 2001
 A Perfect Gentleman (1927 film), a Swedish silent drama film
 A Perfect Gentleman (1928 film), an American silent comedy film
The Perfect Gentleman (film), a 1935 film starring Frank Morgan
"The Perfect Gentleman" (short story), by Jeffrey Archer

See also
Perfect Gentlemen, an American R&B trio
Perfect Gentlemen (film), a 1978 American television film